Mamko Moja ("Ej mamko, mamko, mamënko moja" ("Oh mother, my mother") ) is a Slovak Roma folk song. 

It is a traditional a wedding song about a girl who desperately wants to get married, which first appeared in male choruses on Moravian and Slovak folk poetry. It has been partly attributed to Leoš Janáček. The Megitza Quartet performed the song live on ABC7's "Chicagoing" with Bill Campbell in September 2009. The Roma folk group Goranie have also performed the song.

References

External links

Slovak songs
Romani culture
Wedding songs
Romani in Slovakia